Argyra perplexa is a species of fly in the family Dolichopodidae. It is distributed in Northwestern Europe, Italy, Hungary and Portugal.

References

Diaphorinae
Insects described in 1918
Diptera of Europe
Taxa named by Theodor Becker